Aleksei Vladimirovich Buryanov (born 12 September 1988) is a former Russian professional football player.

Club career
He played in the Russian Football National League for FC Lada Togliatti in 2006.

External links
 
 

1988 births
Living people
Russian footballers
Association football midfielders
FC Lada-Tolyatti players